Ian Holm was an acclaimed actor of the stage and screen. 

He received numerous accolades including two BAFTA Awards and a Tony Award along with nominations for an Academy Award and two Emmy Awards. He was made a Commander of the Order of the British Empire (CBE) in 1989 by Queen Elizabeth II.

Holm won the 1967 Tony Award for Best Featured Actor for his performance as Lenny in the Harold Pinter play The Homecoming. He won the Laurence Olivier Award for Best Actor for his performance in the title role in the 1998 West End production of King Lear. For his television roles he received two Primetime Emmy Award nominations for King Lear (1998), and the HBO film The Last of the Blonde Bombshells (2003).

Major associations

Academy Awards

BAFTA Awards

Emmy Awards

Screen Actors Guild Awards

Laurence Olivier Awards

Tony Awards

Miscellaneous awards

References
Sources

External links
 

Holm, Ian